Colliding Skies is the third studio album by Australian progressive metal band Chaos Divine. It was released on 6 March 2015 through Firestarter Music & Distribution.

Track listing

Personnel
Chaos Divine
David Anderton - Vocals
Ryan Felton - Guitar, keyboards, artwork, backing vocals on 'Soldiers'
Simon Mitchell - Guitar, engineering
Michael Kruit - Bass guitar
Ben Mazzarol - Drums

Additional personnel
Brody Simpson - Additional drum engineering, percussion
Dylan Hooper - Saxophone on 'With Nothing We Depart'
Troy Nababan, Andy Jones, Jon Mazzardis - Backing vocals on 'Soldiers'
Forrester Savell - Mixing, mastering

References

2015 albums